Fingal  is a rural locality in the local government area (LGA) of Break O'Day in the North-east LGA region of Tasmania. The 2016 census recorded a population of 405 for the state suburb of Fingal.

It is a small town in Fingal Valley in the north-east of Tasmania.

History
Fingal was gazetted as a locality in 1965.

The Fingal area was surveyed in 1824 by Roderic O'Connor and John Helder Wedge, and is believed to have been named after Fingal's Cave in the Inner Hebrides of Scotland rather than Fingal in Ireland. The town of Fingal came into existence in 1827 as a convict station, and experienced a boom when Van Diemen's Land's first payable gold was discovered in nearby Mangana.

Fingal Post Office opened on 1 June 1832.

Geography
Almost all the boundaries are survey lines. The South Esk River flows through from north to south-west.

Climate

Road infrastructure
Route A4 (Esk Main Road) runs through from south-west to north-east.

See also
 Electoral district of Fingal former Tasmanian House of Assembly district.

References

External links

Fingal Online Access Centre, Tasmanian Communities Online

Towns in Tasmania
North East Tasmania
Localities of Break O'Day Council